Nahid (meaning "Venus") is an Iranian solar-powered communication satellite with a planned launch to low Earth orbit in September 2019. An explosion occurred on the launch pad during launch preparation on 29 August 2019, though the satellite itself was apparently not part of the test and remains undamaged. 

Nahid has been built with the aim to gain knowhow and experience in the development of Geosynchronous communication satellites. It is the first Iranian satellite equipped with deployable solar panels.

See also
Safir (rocket)
Omid

References

External links
 Nahid 1 at Gunter's Space Page

Satellites of Iran
2019 in Iran
Science and technology in Iran
2019 in spaceflight